Kåre Østerdal (2 December 1917 – 21 November 1973) was a Norwegian Olympic skier from Nordland.

Østerdal was born in Rana, Norway. He competed in cross-country skiing and Nordic combined at the 1948 Winter Olympics.

Cross-country skiing results

References

External links

1917 births
1973 deaths
People from Rana, Norway
Norwegian male cross-country skiers
Norwegian male Nordic combined skiers
Olympic cross-country skiers of Norway
Olympic Nordic combined skiers of Norway
Cross-country skiers at the 1948 Winter Olympics
Nordic combined skiers at the 1948 Winter Olympics
Sportspeople from Nordland
20th-century Norwegian people